Karl "Vogerl" Geyer (24 March 1899 – 21 February 1998) was an Austrian international footballer and coach. He was the coach of the Austria national football team from 1955–1956.

References

1899 births
1998 deaths
Association football forwards
Austrian footballers
Austria international footballers
Austrian football managers
FK Austria Wien players
SK Brann managers
FK Austria Wien managers
Austria national football team managers
Expatriate football managers in Norway